Gruzka  (Hruzka) is a village in the administrative district of Gmina Kleszczele, within Hajnówka County, Podlaskie Voivodeship, in north-eastern Poland, close to the border with Belarus.

According to the 1921 census, the village was inhabited by 76 people, among whom 173 Orthodox, and 3 Mosaic. At the same time, 73 inhabitants declared Belarusian nationality, and 3 Jewish. There were 13 residential buildings in the village.

References

Gruzka